Telecommunication Tower Aarhus (Danish Søsterhøj Antennen, Søsterhøj Senderen or simply Søsterhøj), is a radio and television transmission tower in Aarhus, Denmark. It is the main transmission antenna in all of Aarhus. The tower is situated on the top of the hill of Søsterhøj (112 metres above sea level) in the neighbourhood of Skåde, in the district of Højbjerg. 

The construction of Telecommunication Tower Aarhus began in 1956, and it was finished later that same year. The tower and mast reach 216 m tall, with the tower itself at 65 metres.

Telecommunication Tower Aarhus has been noted worldwide for its relatively unusual use of concrete as a construction material for the tower supporting the long wired mast.

See also
 List of tallest structures in Denmark

External links
 Scyscraperpage.com Søsterhøj Senderen on Scyscraperpage.com
 Emporis.com Søsterhøj Senderen on Emporis.com

Radio masts and towers in Europe
Towers completed in 1956
Towers in Denmark
Telecommunications in Denmark
Buildings and structures in Aarhus